The 1994–95 season was the 96th season of competitive league football in the history of English football club Wolverhampton Wanderers. They played the season in the second tier of the English football system, the Football League First Division.

This was the first full season since the completion of the redevelopment of their Molineux Stadium had been completed, and funding from owner Sir Jack Hayward were now fully focused on improving the team. Manager Graham Taylor spent close to £5 million during the season in an attempt to return the club to the top flight.

Despite suffering extensive injuries to many players, the team finished the season in fourth place – their highest position in the football pyramid since 1983–84 – and so qualified for the play-offs. In the play-off semi-finals they were defeated by the eventual promoted side Bolton Wanderers 2–3 on aggregate.

Results

Pre-season
Wolves' pre season saw them travel to Denmark and Sweden for several weeks of training and friendly matches. They then returned home to play two home games against Premiership opposition.

Football League First Division

A total of 24 teams competed in the Football League First Division in the 1994–95 season. Each team played every other team twice: once at their stadium, and once at the opposition's. Three points were awarded to teams for each win, one point per draw, and none for defeats. Teams finishing level on points were firstly divided by the number of goals scored rather than goal difference. Only one team was automatically promoted due to the reduction in the number of Premiership teams from 22 to 20.

The provisional fixture list was released on 23 June 1994, but was subject to change in the event of matches being selected for television coverage or police concerns.

Final table

Source: Statto.com

Results summary

Results by round

Play-offs

FA Cup

League Cup

Anglo-Italian Cup

Wolves played in Group A of the competition, in which the best English club in the group would advance to the semi-finals. However, they finished fourth in the group overall, and were only the second-best English side and so eliminated.

Players

|-
|align="left"|||align="left"| 
|0||0||0||0||0||0||0||0||0||0||0||0||0||0||
|-
|align="left"|||align="left"| 
|||0||4||0||0||0||0||0||3||0||16||0||0||0||
|-
|align="left"|||align="left"| 
|37||0||2||0||3||0||2||0||1||0||45||0||0||0||
|-
|align="left"|||align="left"| 
|||0||3||0||||0||0||0||4||0||||0||0||0||
|-
|align="left"|||align="left"| 
|13||4||4||0||0||0||0||0||0||0||style="background:#98FB98"|17||4||0||0||
|-
|align="left"|||align="left"| 
|17||0||6||0||0||0||0||0||0||0||style="background:#98FB98"|23||0||0||1||
|-
|align="left"|||align="left"| 
|||0||0||0||0||0||0||0||0||0||||0||0||0||
|-
|align="left"|||style="background:#faecc8" align="left"|  ‡
|10||2||0||0||0||0||2||0||0||0||style="background:#98FB98"|12||2||0||0||
|-
|align="left"|||align="left"|  (c)
|||0||2||0||2||0||2||0||2||0||||0||0||0||
|-
|align="left"|||align="left"|  †
|0||0||0||0||0||0||0||0||0||0||0||0||0||0||
|-
|align="left"|||align="left"| 
|||0||1||0||3||0||0||0||2||0||style="background:#98FB98"|||0||0||1||
|-
|align="left"|||align="left"| 
|||9||5||0||3||0||2||0||4||0||||9||0||0||
|-
|align="left"|||align="left"| 
|||3||||0||3||0||2||1||4||1||||5||0||0||
|-
|align="left"|||align="left"| 
|||0||||0||0||0||0||0||1||0||||0||0||0||
|-
|align="left"|||align="left"| 
|||1||1||0||3||1||0||0||||0||||2||0||0||
|-
|align="left"|||align="left"|  †
|0||0||0||0||0||0||0||0||0||0||0||0||0||0||
|-
|align="left"|||align="left"|  †
|0||0||0||0||0||0||0||0||0||0||0||0||0||0||
|-
|align="left"|||align="left"| 
|21||0||5||1||0||0||2||0||0||0||style="background:#98FB98"|28||1||0||0||
|-
|align="left"|||align="left"| 
|||0||0||0||0||0||0||0||0||0||style="background:#98FB98"|||0||0||0||
|-
|align="left"|||align="left"| 
|||4||6||1||0||0||2||0||||0||||5||0||0||
|-
|align="left"|||align="left"| 
|||7||||0||||0||0||0||||0||style="background:#98FB98"|||7||0||0||
|-
|align="left"|||align="left"| 
|||0||0||0||3||0||0||0||4||0||||0||0||0||
|-
|align="left"|||align="left"| 
|20||2||0||0||3||1||0||0||2||0||style="background:#98FB98"|25||3||0||0||
|-
|align="left"|||align="left"|  †
|||0||0||0||||0||0||0||2||0||||0||0||0||
|-
|align="left"|||align="left"| 
|0||0||0||0||0||0||0||0||0||0||0||0||0||0||
|-
|align="left"|||align="left"|  †
|0||0||0||0||0||0||0||0||0||0||0||0||0||0||
|-
|align="left"|||align="left"| 
|||0||||0||||0||2||0||||0||||0||0||0||
|-
|align="left"|||align="left"| 
|||1||0||0||1||0||0||0||2||0||||1||0||0||
|-
|align="left"|||style="background:#faecc8" align="left"|  ‡
|11||3||0||0||0||0||0||0||0||0||style="background:#98FB98"|11||3||0||0||
|-
|align="left"|||align="left"| 
|||0||0||0||0||0||||0||0||0||style="background:#98FB98"|||0||0||0||
|-
|align="left"|FW||align="left"| 
|31||16||2||0||3||2||2||1||1||0||39||19||0||0||
|-
|align="left"|FW||align="left"| 
|24||3||||0||0||0||2||0||0||0||style="background:#98FB98"|||3||0||0||
|-
|align="left"|FW||align="left"| 
|||15||6||4||3||2||2||0||1||1||||22||0||1||
|-
|align="left"|FW||align="left"|  †
|||1||||1||0||0||0||0||2||1||||3||0||0||
|-
|align="left"|FW||style="background:#faecc8" align="left"|  ‡
|||2||0||0||0||0||0||0||2||0||style="background:#98FB98"|||2||0||0||
|}
Source: Wolverhampton Wanderers: The Complete Record

Transfers

In

Out

Loans in

Management and coaching staff

References

Wolverhampton Wanderers F.C. seasons
Wolverhampton Wanderers